During the 2002–03 English football season, Sheffield Wednesday competed in the Football League First Division.

Season summary
After the Owls made a terrible start to the 2002–03 season, manager Terry Yorath resigned in October and Hartlepool manager Chris Turner - a former Owls goalkeeper - was appointed as his replacement. Turner made a big effort to rejuvenate the side and there were some impressive results during the final weeks of the season, but a failure to beat Brighton in the penultimate game of the season condemned them to relegation.

Final league table

Results
Sheffield Wednesday's score comes first

Legend

Football League First Division

FA Cup

League Cup

Squad

Left club during season

References

2002-03
Sheffield Wednesday